Gnaphosa opaca is a ground spider species found from Europe to Central Asia.

See also 
 List of Gnaphosidae species

References

External links 

Gnaphosidae
Spiders of Europe
Spiders of Asia
Spiders described in 1879